Muhammed Şengezer (born 5 January 1997) is a Turkish professional footballer who plays as a goalkeeper for İstanbul Başakşehir.

Professional career
Muhammed is a youth product of Bursaspor, and was loaned to Yeşil Bursa A.Ş. in the TFF Second League where he was a starter for the team at 18 years of age. Muhammed made his professional debut for Bursaspor in a 2-1 Süper Lig win over Kardemir Karabükspor on 26 November 2017.

On 2 September 2019, he signed 5-year contract with İstanbul Başakşehir.

References

External links
 
 
 
 
 Bursaspor profile

1997 births
Living people
People from Osmangazi
Turkish footballers
Turkey youth international footballers
Bursaspor footballers
İstanbul Başakşehir F.K. players
Adana Demirspor footballers
Süper Lig players
TFF First League players
Association football goalkeepers